Copp or Copps may refer to:

People
 Andrew Copp (born 1994), American ice hockey player
 Douglas Harold Copp (1915–1998), Canadian scientist
 Kyle Copp (born 1996), Welsh footballer
 Michael Copps (born 1940), former Commissioner of the U.S. Federal Communications Commission
 Michael Copps Costello (1875–1936), Canadian printer politician
 Sheila Copps (born 1952), Canadian politician
 Stanley Copp (1914–1987), Canadian politician
 Terry Copp (born 1938), Canadian military historian and Professor Emeritus
 Victor Copps (1919–1988), Canadian politician

Other
 Certificate of pharmaceutical product, a certificate which establishes the status of a pharmaceutical product
 COPP (chemotherapy), a chemotherapy regimen for treatment of non-Hodgkin lymphoma
 COPP (Combined Operations Pilotage Parties), a defunct British special military unit
 Copps Coliseum, a sports and entertainment venue in Hamilton, Ontario
 Copps Food Center, a supermarket chain in Wisconsin